Argos Volley is a professional volleyball team based in Sora, Italy. The club plays in SuperLega (previous Serie A1), highest level of the Italian Volleyball League. In season 2016/17 club is named Biosì Indexa Sora.

History
Argos Sora debuted in the highest level of the Italian Volleyball League (SuperLega) in 2016. Before first season in SuperLega, in June was announced the new head coach of club Bruno Bagnoli. Squad on season 2016/17 was completed in July.

Team

References

External links
 
 LegaVolley squad

Italian volleyball clubs